Valnemulin (trade name Econor or Biotilina) is a pleuromutilin antibiotic used to treat swine dysentery, ileitis, colitis and pneumonia. It is also used for the prevention of intestinal infections of swine. Valnemulin has been observed to induce a rapid reduction of clinical symptoms of Mycoplasma bovis infection, and eliminate M. bovis from the lungs of calves.

References 

Pleuromutilin antibiotics
Secondary alcohols
Ketones
Thioethers
Carboxamides
Carboxylate esters
Vinyl compounds